Nelson Fabián Zelaya Ramírez (born 9 July 1973, in Asunción) is a Paraguayan former footballer who played as a defender.

Career
Zelaya started his career at the youth divisions of Atletico Juventud of Loma Pyta before signing for Olimpia in 1996. While in Olimpia, Zelaya won several national and international championships and was a key part of the defense. He also played for Olimpia's rival Cerro Porteño in 2001 and had brief stints in Spain, Chile, Venezuela and Bolivia where he played for teams like Recreativo Huelva, Universidad de Concepción, Estudiantes de Mérida and The Strongest.

Titles

External links
 Nelson Zelaya at BDFA.com.ar 
 Analisis Olimpia
 

1973 births
Living people
Sportspeople from Asunción
Paraguayan footballers
Paraguayan expatriate footballers
Paraguay international footballers
Club Olimpia footballers
Cerro Porteño players
Recreativo de Huelva players
Universidad de Concepción footballers
Estudiantes de Mérida players
Club Nacional footballers
The Strongest players
La Liga players
Chilean Primera División players
Expatriate footballers in Chile
Expatriate footballers in Bolivia
Expatriate footballers in Spain
Expatriate footballers in Venezuela
Association football defenders